John Curtis (died 1775) was an Irish politician.

Curtis was a Member of Parliament representing Ratoath in the Irish House of Commons between 1761 and 1768.

References

Year of birth unknown
1775 deaths
Irish MPs 1761–1768
Members of the Parliament of Ireland (pre-1801) for County Meath constituencies